"Chemistry" is a song by Dutch recording artist Eva Simons. It was released in the Netherlands on March 20, 2013. Although song did not achieve the same commercial and critical success as the earlier singles, it did climb to number 28 and spend 5 weeks on the Dutch Top 40 charts. The song was used in a Pepsi ad campaign in the Netherlands which gave customers a chance to meet Simons when she performed on Beyoncé's The Mrs. Carter Show World Tour.

Track listing and formats
Digital download 
"Chemistry" - 3:30

Charts

Year-end charts

References

2013 singles
Eva Simons songs
2013 songs
Interscope Records singles
Songs written by Eva Simons